Scott Allardice (born 31 March 1998) is a Scottish footballer who plays as a defensive midfielder for Scottish club Inverness Caledonian Thistle. He began his career with Dundee United, making his first team debut in April 2017. He spent loan spells with East Fife and Dumbarton in 2018 before joining Bohemians in 2019. He has represented the Scotland national under-19 team.

Early life
Scott Allardice was born in Dundee on 31 March 1998. He began his football career with Dundee Rovers and Celtic Boys Club before joining Dundee as a youth player. A pupil at St John's Roman Catholic High School, he joined the Dundee United youth programme based at the school in 2010, where he was coached by Ian Cathro.

Club career
Allardice signed his first professional contract for Dundee United in June 2014, but missed most of the 2014–15 season due to a knee injury. He made his first team debut against Falkirk in a Scottish Championship match on 8 April 2017.

Allardice was loaned to East Fife in February 2018. In May 2018 he signed a new one-year contract with Dundee United before joining Scottish League One side Dumbarton on a six-month loan deal. He made 13 appearances for Dumbarton before returning to United in January 2019. He was released later that month, joining League of Ireland Premier Division club Bohemians after a successful trial. He would go on to wear the captains armband for Bohemians in his native Scotland as the Irish outfit took part in the Scottish Challenge Cup in place of club captain Derek Pender who was rested for the trip. Allardice signed for League of Ireland team Waterford before the 2020 season commenced.

In August 2020, Allardice joined Inverness Caledonian Thistle on a one-year deal. He signed a two-year contract extension in January 2021.

International career
Allardice has represented the Scotland under-19 team.

Career statistics

References

External links

Living people
1998 births
Footballers from Dundee
Scottish footballers
Association football midfielders
Dundee United F.C. players
Scottish Professional Football League players
Scotland youth international footballers
East Fife F.C. players
Dumbarton F.C. players
Bohemian F.C. players
Waterford F.C. players
League of Ireland players
Inverness Caledonian Thistle F.C. players